Gal is a trilingual semimonthly newspaper published in Gali District, Abkhazia. It is the only (partially) Mingrelian-language newspaper in the world. It was founded in 1995 by Nugzar Salakaia, who is still the editor. Gal has a circulation of 1,000.

Between 1995 and 1998, the building that housed the newspaper's office and printing press was blown up six times by Georgian paramilitary forces.

References

1995 establishments in Abkhazia
Abkhaz-language newspapers
Mass media in Gali
Mingrelian-language newspapers
Newspapers established in 1995
Newspapers published in Abkhazia
Russian-language newspapers